Giuseppe Beltramelli (15 May 1734 – 1816) was an Italian scholar and art collector.

He was born to an aristocratic family in Bergamo. He studied in the Jesuit college of Bologna, and studied design under Domenico Fratta, a member of the Accademia Clementina. He returned to Bergamo, where his palace became host to a superb art, artifact, and book collection. In Bergamo he patronized artists, including the poet Countess Paolina Secco Suardo Grismondi, who wrote under the pen-name of Lesbia Cidonia. He collaborated with writers such as Morelli, Serassi, Tiraboschi, Lande, and Lanzi. He lived for two years in Paris, meeting major artists and scholars of the period including Dorat, Diderot, d'Alembert, de la Condamine, and Madame du Boccage. In London, he met PH Maty and Moschelin, and befriended Angelica Kauffman. He returned to Bergamo impoverished, and sold his collections, but was able to gain a professorship in eloquence and belle-lettere. He was a prolific writer on art.

References

1734 births
1816 deaths
18th-century Italian writers
18th-century Italian male writers
19th-century Italian writers
18th-century Italian poets
People from Bergamo
19th-century Italian male writers